Group E of the 2017 Africa Cup of Nations qualification tournament was one of the thirteen groups to decide the teams which qualified for the 2017 Africa Cup of Nations finals tournament. The group consisted of four teams: Zambia, Congo, Kenya, and Guinea-Bissau.

The teams played against each other home-and-away in a round-robin format, between June 2015 and September 2016.

Guinea-Bissau, the group winners, qualified for the 2017 Africa Cup of Nations.

Standings

Matches

Goalscorers
5 goals

 Férébory Doré

3 goals

 Winston Kalengo

2 goals

 Jordan Massengo
 Prince Oniangué
 Zezinho
 Ayub Masika
 Collins Mbesuma

1 goal

 Idrissa Camará
 Cícero
 Eridson
 Frédéric Mendy
 Toni Silva
 Eric Johanna
 Michael Olunga
 Paul Were
 Rainford Kalaba
 Christopher Katongo

Notes

References

External links
Orange Africa Cup Of Nations Qualifiers 2017, CAFonline.com

Group E